Chahar Bolagh (also Romanized as Chahār Bolāgh; also known as Chehār Bulāq) is a village in Boghrati Rural District, Sardrud District, Razan County, Hamadan Province, Iran. At the 2006 census, its population was 821, in 180 families.

References 

Populated places in Razan County